Lucas Paulini (born March 19, 1989 in Buenos Aires) is an Argentine former footballer and assistant manager who currently serves an assistant manager for Virginia Commonwealth University.

Career

College and Amateur
Paulini moved from his native Argentina to the United States in 2007 when he was offered a college soccer scholarship to Tusculum College. He scored seven goals and picked up 10 assists in his freshman year at Tusculum, on his way to being named the South Atlantic Conference Freshman of the Year, and to the All-South Atlantic Conference First Team. He was named to the All-South Atlantic Conference first team and the All-Region Division II second team as a sophomore in 2008, before transferring to Virginia Commonwealth University prior to his senior year.

During his college years he played in the USL Premier Development League for the Mississippi Brilla.

Professional
Paulini turned professional in 2011 when he signed with Atlanta Silverbacks of the North American Soccer League. He made his professional debut on April 9, 2011 in a game against the NSC Minnesota Stars Atlanta announced on November 8, 2011 that Paulini would return for the 2012 season.

References

External links
Atlanta Silverbacks bio
Tusculum College profile

1989 births
Living people
Argentine footballers
Argentine expatriate footballers
VCU Rams men's soccer players
Mississippi Brilla players
Atlanta Silverbacks players
Richmond Kickers players
Expatriate soccer players in the United States
USL League Two players
North American Soccer League players
USL Championship players
Association football forwards
Association football midfielders
Footballers from Buenos Aires
VCU Rams men's soccer coaches